Eigeltingen is a town in the district of Konstanz in Baden-Württemberg in Germany.

References

Konstanz (district)
Hegau